Amaro is Special  Woreda in Southern Nations, Nationalities, and Peoples' Region, Ethiopia. The people are called Koore and their language is Koorete. Amaro is one of the areas in which members of Koore nations widely live in. However, no fewer Koore's live in their neighboring areas of Gamo Gofa, Guji, Gedeo, and Burji. Prior to 2011, Amaro was not part of any Zone in the SNNPR and was therefore considered a special woreda, an administrative subdivision which is similar to an autonomous area. In 2011, the Segen Area Peoples Zone was established, which includes Amaro woreda and the 3 former special woredas surrounding it. Located in the Great Rift Valley, Amaro is bordered on the south by Burji special woreda, on the southwest by Konso special woreda, on the west by Dirashe special woreda, on the northwest by Gamo Gofa and Lake Chamo, and on the north by Lake Abaya and in east and northeast by Oromia Region. It is divided into 35 kebeles. The administrative center of the woreda is Kelle. Jijola, Derba Menena, and Kereda are other growing municipals of the woreda.

The highest peak in the woreda is Mount Dello (3600 meters), which is part of the Amaro mountains, the highest in Jemjem plateau and the second from SNNPR. Much of the western part of this woreda lies inside the (Enee Shanka) Nechisar National Park. The major crops grown in Amaro are enset (Enset ventricosum), teff, maize, wheat, barley, navy beans, and coffee. Amaro has 39 kilometers of all-weather roads and 16 kilometers of dry-weather roads, for an average road density of 36 kilometers per 1000 square kilometers. The Central Statistical Agency (CSA) reported that 1,082 tons of coffee were produced in the year ending in 2005, based on inspection records from the Ethiopian Coffee and Tea authority. This represents 0.48% of the SNNPR's output and 1.08% of Ethiopia's total output.

This woreda was selected as one of the three areas for Agri-Service Ethiopia to implement an Integrated Food Security Program. This Program operates in 10 of the woreda's kebeles, with the goal of improving agricultural practices, developing new rural water sources, and maintain and improve the existing local schools.

Amaro is well known and rich by yearly overflowing rivers.  Bewaye, Sarmale (Segen), Duano, Kondilcho are some of them. with the time now, due to the number of the people are increasing in alarming rate and the societies facing many challenges that arise from mal-administration from so-called segen zone, peoples are demanding the demolition of the zone and strongly claiming the assurance of their own right to self-administration under the status of independent Amaro Koore zone.

Demographics 
Based on the 2007 Census conducted by the Central Statistical Agency of Ethiopia (CSA), this woreda has a total population of 149,231, of whom 75,202 are men and 74,029 women. With an area of 1,522.16 square kilometers, Amaro has a population density of 104.93; 8,633 or 5.78% are urban inhabitants. A total of 28,969 households were counted in this woreda, which results in an average of 5.15 persons to a household, and 27,941 housing units. The largest ethnic group reported in Amaro was the Koorete (97.8%); all other ethnic groups made up 2.2% of the population. Koorete was spoken as a first language by 97.36% of the inhabitants, and 1.28% spoke Amharic; the remaining 1.36% spoke all other primary languages reported. 87.76% of the population said they were Protestants, 6.12% practiced Ethiopian Orthodox Christianity, 2.78% practiced traditional beliefs, 1.84% were Catholics, and 1.14% were Muslim.

In the 1994 Census this woreda had a population of 98,315 in 19,060 households, of whom 49,277 were men and 49,038 women; 3,059 or 3.11% of its population were urban dwellers. The two largest ethnic groups reported in Amaro were the Koorete (93.11%), and the Amhara (0.8%); all other ethnic groups made up 6.19% of the population. Koorete was spoken as a first language by 97.79% of the inhabitants, 0.82% spoke Oromo, and 0.82% spoke Amharic; the remaining 0.57% spoke all other primary languages reported.  51.63% of the population said they were Protestants, 35.46% practiced traditional religions, and 10.38% practiced Ethiopian Orthodox Christianity. Concerning education, 22.76% of the population were considered literate; 10.54% of children aged 7–12 were in primary school; 1.32% of the children aged 13–14 were in junior secondary school, and 0.84% of the inhabitants aged 15–18 were in senior secondary school. Concerning sanitary conditions, about 36% of the urban houses and 9% of all houses had access to safe drinking water at the time of the census; 60% of the urban and 10% of the total had toilet facilities.

See also
Derba, Amaro

Notes 

Southern Nations, Nationalities, and Peoples' Region
Special woredas of Ethiopia